"The Caterpillar" is a song by English rock band The Cure, released as the sole single from their fifth studio album The Top. It was written by Robert Smith and Lol Tolhurst.

Music video 

As with many other singles, the song's music video was directed by Tim Pope. It was shot in the Great Conservatory in Syon Park, London. Phil Thornalley and Porl Thompson appear in the music video, but do not contribute to the song.

Release 

"The Caterpillar" was the sole single released from the band's fifth album The Top. In early 1984, it spent seven weeks in the UK Singles Chart, peaking at number 14 on 7 April of that year. It spent five weeks on the Dutch charts in June 1984, reaching number 35 there on 2 June. It reached number 51 on the Australian Kent Music Report chart.

Track listing

 7"
 "The Caterpillar" (3:40)
 "Happy the Man" (2:45)

 12"
 "The Caterpillar" (3:40)
 "Happy the Man" (2:45)
 "Throw Your Foot" (3:32)

Personnel

Robert Smith – vocals, guitar, bass, violin
Andy Anderson – percussion
Lol Tolhurst – keyboards

References

External links
 

1984 singles
The Cure songs
Songs written by Robert Smith (musician)
Music videos directed by Tim Pope
1984 songs
Fiction Records singles
Songs written by Lol Tolhurst
Song recordings produced by David M. Allen